Kurt Bausback (born May 26, 1960) is an American rower. He competed in the men's coxless pair event at the 1988 Summer Olympics.

References

External links
 

1960 births
Living people
American male rowers
Olympic rowers of the United States
Rowers at the 1988 Summer Olympics
Sportspeople from San Diego
Pan American Games medalists in rowing
Pan American Games gold medalists for the United States
Rowers at the 1983 Pan American Games
Rowers at the 1987 Pan American Games
Medalists at the 1983 Pan American Games